Antonín Balda (born 6 February 1910, date of death unknown) was a Czech weightlifter. He competed for Czechoslovakia in the men's lightweight event at the 1936 Summer Olympics.

References

External links
 
 

1910 births
Year of death missing
Czech male weightlifters
Olympic weightlifters of Czechoslovakia
Weightlifters at the 1936 Summer Olympics
Place of birth missing